List of hospitals in Montana (U.S. state), grouped by city and sorted by hospital name.

Anaconda
Community Hospital of Anaconda

Baker
Fallon Medical Complex

Big Sandy
Big Sandy Medical Center

Big Sky
Big Sky Medical Center

Big Timber
Pioneer Medical Center

Billings
Billings Clinic
St. Vincent Healthcare

Boulder
Montana Developmental Center

Bozeman
Bozeman Health Deaconess Hospital
Student Health Service Montana State University

Butte
St. James Healthcare

Chester
Liberty County Hospital and Nursing Home

Choteau
Teton Medical Center

Circle
McCone County Health Center

Columbus
Stillwater Billings Clinic

Conrad
Pondera Medical Center

Crow Agency
Crow/Northern Cheyenne Hospital

Culbertson
Roosevelt Memorial Medical Center

Cut Bank
Northern Rockies Medical Center

Deer Lodge
Montana State Prison Infirmary
Powell County Medical Center

Dillon
Barrett Hospital & HealthCare

Ekalaka
Dahl Memorial Healthcare Association

Ennis
Madison Valley Hospital

Forsyth
Rosebud Health Care Center

Fort Benton
Missouri River Medical Center

Fort Harrison
Veterans Affairs Montana Health Care System

Glasgow
Frances Mahon Deaconess Hospital

Glendive
Glendive Medical Center

Great Falls
Benefis Health System
Central Montana Surgical Hospital

Hamilton
Marcus Daly Memorial Hospital

Hardin
Big Horn County Memorial Hospital

Harlem
Fort Belknap U. S. Public Health Service Indian Hospital

Harlowton
Wheatland Memorial Hospital

Havre
Northern Montana Hospital

Helena
Shodair Children's Hospital
St. Peter's Hospital

Jordan
Garfield County Health Center

Kalispell
Health Center Northwest
Kalispell Regional Medical Center

Lewistown
Central Montana Medical Center

Libby
 Cabinet Peaks Medical Center 
 St John's Lutheran Hospital

Livingston
Livingston Healthcare

Malta
Phillips County Hospital

Miles City
Holy Rosary Healthcare

Missoula
Community Medical Center
St. Patrick Hospital and Health Sciences Center
University of Montana Health Service

Philipsburg
Granite County Medical Center

Plains
Clark Fork Valley Hospital

Plentywood
Sheridan Memorial Hospital

Polson
St. Joseph Medical Center (Montana)

Poplar
Poplar Community Hospital

Red Lodge
Beartooth Hospital and Health Center

Ronan
St. Luke Community Hospital

Roundup
Roundup Memorial Healthcare

Saint Mary
U.S. Public Health Service Blackfeet Community Hospital

Scobey
Daniels Memorial Healthcare Center

Shelby
Logan Health - Shelby

Sheridan
Ruby Valley Hospital

Sidney
Sidney Health Center

Superior
Mineral Community Hospital

Terry
Prairie Community Health Center

Townsend
Broadwater Health Center

Warmsprings
Montana State Hospital

White Sulphur Springs
Mountainview Medical Center

Whitefish
North Valley Hospital

Wolf Point
Trinity Hospital

References

External links
Montana Hospitals

Montana
Hospitals